The subjunctive in Dutch is a verb mood typically used in dependent clauses to express a wish, command, emotion, possibility, uncertainty, doubt, judgment, opinion, necessity, or action that has not yet occurred.

It is also referred to as the conjunctive mood as it often follows a conjunction. As in English the subjunctive mood in Dutch has gradually been replaced by modal auxiliary verbs. As a consequence of this, its contemporary use is mostly—but not completely—confined to set phrases and semi-fixed expressions. Readers of older Dutch texts frequently encounter the use of the subjunctive, especially in legal, judicial, literary and religious texts.

Formation

Present subjunctive
 (OTT), imperfect present tense:
First person: present root + e or if the root ends on a vowel: root
Second person: present root +et or root +e: ', 
Third person: present root +e: 
Plural: present infinitive: 

Past subjunctive
 (OVT), imperfect past tense:
First person: past root + e: .
Second person: past root + e: .
Plural: past infinitive: .

Future subjunctive
The future subjunctive is mostly a theoretical construct, which has almost never been used.
OTkT (imperfect future tense): OTT of  + present infinitive: .
OVTkT (imperfect past future tense): OVT of  + present infinitive: .

Usage
In Dutch, the subjunctive mood can express a
wish: hence, it fulfills the function of the optative mood in other languages.
command
condition: hence, it fulfills the function of the conditional mood in other languages.
irreality: hence, it fulfills the function of the irrealis mood in other languages.
possibility: potentialisdoubt
uncertainty
concession
purpose
exhortation: it fulfills the function of the hortative mood in other languages.

The subjunctive was quite common in the past, and is often encountered in older Dutch texts. It underwent a slow but steady decline in use, first in the spoken language and later in the written language. It was already noted by linguists in the early 20th century that the use of the subjunctive in oral language was rare. By that time the use of the subjunctive in writing was also dwindling, a process that continued throughout the 20th century.

If the subjunctive is used in accordance with the rules mentioned in this article, it is still considered grammatically correct but often sounds archaic or formal. In contemporary Dutch the subjunctive is no longer actively used, save for a few exceptions and a large range of set phrases.

Command or wish
The subjunctive can express a wish or command. As such the subjunctive fulfills the function of what is known as the optative mood in some other languages. Example sentences:
 ('Long live the queen!'). ('May they rest in peace.')! ('May things go well for you!'). ('May God bless and save you.')! ('May luck be with you!'). ('I may inform you that we have received your letter.')! ('I wish he had been wiser!')

Example sentences: . Many religious texts and official government or business letters still make use of the optative subjunctive.

Exhortation
The subjunctive can express an exhortation. This form is archaic and is usually expressed in modern Dutch with the auxiliary verb  ('must' or 'should') or the imperative is used. Exceptions may be found in cookbook recipe formulas, normally in combination with the third person form  ('one' or 'you'). . ('You should take three eggs.')./Modern Dutch: De lezer moet wel bedenken dat dit boek vijftig jaar geleden geschreven is. ('The reader should keep in mind that this book was written fifty years ago.')./Modern Dutch: . ('One should tell others.')./Modern Dutch: . ('One should reread my letter.')./Modern Dutch: . ('The user should take note of this.')

Irreality
The subjunctive can be used to express an irrealis situation. Example sentences:. ('The man spoke about the bank robbery as if it were a Sunday trip.')

Concession
The subjunctive can express a concession. Example sentences:. ('Whoever he may be.'). ('Whatever he may do.'). ('However it may be.'). ('I agree with his views, though not wholeheartedly.')

Set phrases
In contemporary Dutch, a wide range of fixed expressions that make use of the subjunctive exist. Some examples are mentioned here.

Proverbs
Some examples:. ('What will be, will be.'). ('Come what may...'). ('Cost what it will...'). ('Every one for oneself' [lit. 'Be saved who can save oneself'])

Formal and religious language
Some examples:
Lord's Prayer: . ('Our Father in heaven, hallowed be your name, your kingdom come, your will be done, on earth as in heaven.')
Oath phrase: . ''('So help me God,' as used in swearing an oath.)
('Would you like to pay in exact change?')

Set words
In some words, the use of the subjunctive can be seen:
'it not be', unless)
('(I wish that) God improve it')
('God be thanked')
The composite words can also be split in their components and form a full-fledged sentence.

See also
Grammatical mood
Subjunctive in English
Archaic Dutch declension

References

External links
 Subjunctive at dutchgrammar.com

Grammatical moods
Dutch language